Carlos Meléndez Ramírez (February 1, 1861 – October 8, 1919) was born in San Salvador, El Salvador to Rafael Meléndez and Mercedes Ramírez (daughter of Norberto Ramírez). He was President of El Salvador from February 9, 1913 to August 29, 1914 and again from March 1, 1915 to December 21, 1918. He was the older brother of president Jorge Meléndez. He died in New York on October 8, 1919, aged 58.

He served as the President of the Legislative Assembly of El Salvador in 1913.

References

1861 births
1919 deaths
People from San Salvador
Salvadoran people of Spanish descent
Presidents of El Salvador
Presidents of the Legislative Assembly of El Salvador
20th-century Salvadoran politicians